Hollywood/Western station is an underground rapid transit station on the B Line of the Los Angeles Metro Rail system. It is located under Hollywood Boulevard at its intersection with Western Avenue. The station serves the East Hollywood area including Thai Town and Little Armenia.

Station design

Hollywood/Western station has a single island platform oriented east–west under Hollywood Boulevard, with a mezzanine above. The single station entrance and elevator are located in a plaza on the southeast corner of the intersection. The station was designed by Escudero–Fribourg Architects, while May Sun designed the interior finish and artworks, which reflect the neighborhood's immigrant heritage. The walls and floors are covered by black, gray, and white tiles, with colorful highlights on the walls. Armenian, Chinese, and Mayan symbols are depicted on granite pavers. Some wall panels display historic photographs of the neighborhood; others have depictions of fossils discovered during excavation of the station. Sculptures of two Pacific Electric Red Cars hang over the platform from the mezzanine wall.

Service

Station layout
Hollywood/Western is a two-story station; the top level is a mezzanine with ticket machines while the bottom is the platform level. The station uses a simple island platform with two tracks.

Hours and frequency

Connections 
, the following connections are available:

References

B Line (Los Angeles Metro) stations
East Hollywood, Los Angeles
Hollywood Boulevard
Railway stations in the United States opened in 1999
1999 establishments in California